The 1985 Karnataka Legislative Assembly election was held in the Indian state of Karnataka to elect 224 members of the Karnataka Legislative Assembly. The elections resulted in a spectacular victory for the Janata Party, led by Chief minister Ramakrishna Hegde.

Results

!colspan=10|
|- align=center
!colspan=2 style="background-color:#E9E9E9" align=center|Party
!style="background-color:#E9E9E9" |SeatsContested
!style="background-color:#E9E9E9" |SeatsWon
!style="background-color:#E9E9E9" |Votes
!style="background-color:#E9E9E9" |Vote %
!style="background-color:#E9E9E9" |Seatchange
|-
| 
|align="left"|Janata Party||205||139||6,418,795||43.60%|| 44
|-
| 
|align="left"|Indian National Congress||223||65||6,009,461||40.82%|| 17
|-
| 
|align="left"|Communist Party of India||7||3||133,008||0.90%||
|-
| 
|align="left"|Bharatiya Janata Party||116||2||571,280||3.88%|| 16
|-
| 
|align="left"|Communist Party of India (Marxist)||7||2||127,333||0.86%|| 1
|-
| 
|align="left"|Independents||1200||13||1,393,626||9.47%|| 9
|-
|
|align="left"|Total||1795||224||14,720,634||||
|-
|}

Elected members

References

Karnataka
State Assembly elections in Karnataka
1980s in Karnataka